Fred van Zutphen (born 7 January 1971 in Veghel, Netherlands), is a retired Dutch athlete who competes in compound archery. Amongst his achievements are competing at the 2000 Summer Olympics in the recurve discipline, where he reached the last 16, winning stages in the team competition at the FITA Archery World Cup in 2006 and 2009, winning silver medals at the European Archery Championships and becoming the world number one ranked archer in 2003.

References

1971 births
Living people
Dutch male archers
Archers at the 2000 Summer Olympics
Olympic archers of the Netherlands
People from Veghel
Sportspeople from North Brabant